Chees may refer to:
Chees, a dolphin character in the animated TV series Delfy and His Friends
Chees, a 1973 poetry collection by Pravin Darji
the plural of Chee (given name)
the plural of Chee (surname)

See also
Cheese
Chess
Cheez (disambiguation)